Miemsie Retief is a South African actress and painter. She started her career as a model and made her acting debut in Nooi van my hart, Afrikaans for 'Girl of my heart'. She was regarded as the South African Marilyn Monroe, because of her blonde hair and beautiful body.

She is married to Fil Heckroodt, a previous director of law at SABC. They currently live in Aucklandpark, Johannesburg.

Filmography 
 Nooi van my hart, 1959
 Piet se tante, 1959
 Oupa en die Plaasnooientjie, 1960
 Jy's Lieflik Vananaad, 1962
 Petticoat Safari, 1969

References

External links 
 Miemsie Retief on IMDb

South African film actresses
20th-century South African actresses
Afrikaner people
Possibly living people
Year of birth missing